The Clarendon Hotel, or Clarendon House, is a high-end hotel in the historic neighbourhood of Old Quebec in Quebec City, Quebec, Canada. It is the oldest continuously operating hotel in the city.

The original building, on the corner of Rue Sainte-Anne and des Jardins, was a house built in 1858 and designed by Charles Baillairgé. It was built as a four-storey house, and was almost immediately sold to Queen's Printers George-Édouard Desbarats and Stewart Derbishire. The building hosted the printers (and various smaller businesses) until 1870, when it became the Russel House hotel, which was sold in 1894, and renamed the Clarendon Hotel. The hotel changed hands again several times until it became part of the Dufour Group hotels.

Important extensions and modifications were made to the building during the 20th century: two extra floors with mansard roof and a six-floor Art Deco extension at 57 Rue Sainte-Anne where the main entrance, originally on des Jardins, was relocated. Soon after, another extension was built to enlarge the hotel. The hotel boasts a fine French restaurant, Le Charles Baillairgé, and a bar, L'Emprise, were renowned live jazz shows used to be held until 2006.

The main architectural interest of the building is its brick Art Deco façade, completed in 1927 and designed by Raoul Chênevert. It also has Art nouveau cast iron grilles and canopy, giving it a unique combination of styles. Built a few years before neighbouring Édifice Price, its decoration is more geometric than figurative. The building still keeps its wicket entrance.

The hotel serves as a backdrop to Nicole Brossard's novel Yesterday, at the Hotel Clarendon.

References

External links

Hotel Clarendon from Yahoo! Travel
Postal card: Clarendon Hotel, date unknown. Quebec National Archives
Postal card: Ladies' Drawing room, date unknown. Quebec National Archives

Hotels in Quebec City
Old Quebec
Art Deco architecture in Canada
Houses completed in 1858
Hotel buildings completed in 1925
Hotels established in 1870
Art Nouveau architecture in Canada
Art Nouveau hotels
Canadian companies established in 1870
1870 establishments in Quebec